Hamdi Bakalli (1923–1991) was an Albanian footballer who played for Vllaznia Shkodër, Ylli I Kuq Shkodër, Partizani Tirana and Dinamo Tirana. He was also a member of the Albania national team between 1950 and 1953.

Club career
A native of Shkodër, Bakalli played for hometown club Vllaznia but also had successful spells at capital clubs Partizani and Dinamo Tirana with whom he won a total of 7 league titles. On 20 March 1947, he scored the first ever goal of the KF Tirana–Partizani Tirana rivalry.

International career
He made his debut for Albania in a September 1950 friendly match against Czechoslovakia and earned a total of 4 caps, scoring no goals. His final international was a November 1953 friendly match against Poland.

Personal life
He was part of a footballing family, as all of his four brothers, Xhabir, Alush, Xhevat and Rifat were also footballers during the 1940s, 1950s and 1960s in Albania.

Honours
Albanian Superliga: 7
 1947, 1948, 1950, 1951, 1952, 1953, 1955

References

1923 births
1991 deaths
Footballers from Shkodër
Albanian footballers
Association football forwards
Albania international footballers
KF Vllaznia Shkodër players
FK Partizani Tirana players
FK Dinamo Tirana players
Kategoria Superiore players